Konappana Agrahara  is a village in the southern state of Karnataka, India. It is located in the Bangalore South taluk of Bangalore Urban district in Karnataka. This area is within Electronic City and is adjacent to Infosys Limited and Hewlett Packard.  India census, Konappana Agrahara had a population of 11038 with 6659 males and 4379 females.

References

External links
 https://web.archive.org/web/20071116153217/http://bangaloreurban.nic.in/

Villages in Bangalore Urban district